Compsobata is a genus of stilt-legged flies in the family Micropezidae. There are at least 20 described species in Compsobata.

Species
These 20 species belong to the genus Compsobata:

 Compsobata borealis Ozerov, 1987 c g
 Compsobata caucasica Ozerov, 1990 c g
 Compsobata cibaria (Linnaeus, 1758) c g
 Compsobata columbiana Merritt, 1976 i c g
 Compsobata dentigera (Loew, 1854) c g
 Compsobata femoralis (Meigen, 1826) c g
 Compsobata jamesi Merritt, 1971 i c g
 Compsobata japonica (Hennig, 1938) c g
 Compsobata kennicotti (Banks, 1926) i c g
 Compsobata microfulcrum (James, 1946) i c g
 Compsobata mima (Hennig, 1936) i c g b
 Compsobata nigricornis (Zetterstedt, 1838) c g
 Compsobata nitens (Loew, 1870) c g
 Compsobata nitidicollis (Frey, 1947) c g
 Compsobata orientalis Ozerov, 1987 c g
 Compsobata pallipes (Say, 1823) i c g
 Compsobata sachalinensis (Hennig, 1938) c g
 Compsobata schumanni Soos, 1975 c g
 Compsobata silvicola Ozerov, 1987 c g
 Compsobata univitta (Walker, 1849) i c g b

Data sources: i = ITIS, c = Catalogue of Life, g = GBIF, b = Bugguide.net

References

Further reading

External links

 

Micropezidae
Articles created by Qbugbot
Nerioidea genera